Iwen Chu is a member of the Democratic Party representing the New York State Senate's 17th district. She is the first Asian American woman to be elected to the state senate.

References

Living people
Year of birth missing (living people)
American politicians of Asian descent
Democratic Party New York (state) state senators
21st-century American politicians
21st-century American women politicians